Scott Ruskin may refer to:
Scott Ruskin (baseball) (born 1963), American baseball player
Scott Ruskin (cricketer) (born 1975), English cricketer